Akatea is the Māori name for at least two different species of white-flowering climbing vine from New Zealand:

Metrosideros albiflora
Metrosideros perforata

References

Flora of New Zealand
Trees of New Zealand